Research-Technology Management (RTM) is a journal published by the Industrial Research Institute (IRI). It publishes peer-reviewed, research-based articles and personal perspective pieces written by and for R&D practitioners. Published bimonthly, the journal is offered both in print and electronically to subscribers interested in the management of innovation.

Oversight of RTM is handled by an appointed Board of Editors, led by the Editor-in-Chief; the Managing Editor handles day-to-day operations.

History

RTM was initially launched as Research Management (RM) in the spring of 1958; Its focus was disseminating information on the techniques of organization, administration, and operation of industrial research. According to Charles Burrill, the first chairman of the Board of Editors for RM, “Why another publication? Because there has been no one place to turn for the latest ideas regarding research management discussions from the research administrator’s point of view.” RM was published quarterly, in digest format, averaging 64 pages per issue. In 1962, the quarterly schedule was upgraded to a bimonthly publication schedule.

In 1982, IRI began presenting the Maurice Holland Award for the best paper published in RM during the previous year. In 1985, RM began publishing the R&D Trends Forecast, which summarized the data collected during IRI's annual survey of its member companies’ spending expectations for the coming year. The article continues to be published in the first issue of RTM each year.
 
In 1988, Research Management was renamed Research-Technology Management (RTM). RTM retained RM’s focus on practitioner-oriented articles. Authors are generally R&D experts from well-known organizations, with some representation of academic researchers. 
 
RTM has been offered electronically since 2001 via Ingenta, with issues as far back as the November–December issue of 1998 available. In 2007, the journal became available on iTunes. In 2011, the journal underwent a redesign; the new layout was unveiled in the January–February 2012 issue.

Past Editors
 1958-1959, Charles M. Burrill (RM Board of Editors chairman)
 1960-1961, William H. Lycan (BOE chair)
 1962-1963, George L. Royer (BOE chair)
 1964-1965, Robert W. Olson (BOE chair)
 1966-1967, Robert N. DuPuis (BOE chair)
 1968-1970, Robert N. DuPuis (Editor, long-term editorial position introduced in 1968)
 1971-1982, Henry R. Clauser (Editor)
 1982-2010, Michael F. Wolff (Executive Editor)
 2010–present, James A. Euchner (Editor-in-Chief)

Maurice Holland Award

The Maurice Holland Award is presented each year by the IRI to honor the most outstanding paper published in the previous year's volume of RTM. Named for IRI's founder, the Holland Award is a bronze replica of a “Jenny”, the model of airplane Maurice Holland flew during his service in World War I. The award was first presented in 1982 by Maurice Holland's son. The Holland Award is presented to the winning paper's authors at IRI's Member Summit, held each year in the fall. The recipient is determined by RTM's Board of Editors.

References

External links
 Research-Technology Management (RTM)

Publications established in 1958
Academic journals published by independent research institutes
Hijacked journals
Bimonthly journals